Jarett Juma Porter Dillard (born December 21, 1985) is an American lawyer and former American football wide receiver of the National Football League. Dillard achieved success as a college football player for Rice, while earning his bachelor's degree in political science. He was drafted by the Jacksonville Jaguars in the fifth round of the 2009 NFL Draft. Following his NFL career, Dillard embarked on a successful legal career. He attended the South Texas College of Law, attaining his Doctor of Jurisprudence (J.D.) degree. Dillard practices law in the State of Texas.

Early years 
Dillard was born and raised in San Antonio, Texas, the son of Porter and Robin Dillard. He has two siblings. Jarett was a valedictorian and Tai was a salutatorian at Sam Houston High School. Darik ranked third in his class at MacArthur High School. Tai played in the Women's National Basketball Association (WNBA), where she played for the San Antonio Stars. Tai also played basketball for The University of Texas at Austin, while earning her Bachelor of Science in Kinesiology. Presently Tai is Assistant coach of the University of Houston's women's basketball team. Brother Darik played football for Rice University, while earning his Bachelor of Science in mechanical engineering.

College career 
In the 2006 season, Dillard captured national attention as no other Rice Owls football player had done. He shattered school receiving records on the way to becoming a finalist for the Biletnikoff Award, given to the nation's top receiver. ESPN's All-America first-team pick broke the NCAA season record for consecutive games with at least one touchdown catch.

As a redshirt sophomore in 2006, he helped lead Rice to its first bowl game in 45 years (1961 Bluebonnet Bowl). Rice closed the season on a 7-1 run, capped by a come-from-behind victory over SMU to clinch a bowl game. During those 8 games, Dillard caught 55 passes for 826 yards and 16 touchdowns. In 2006, Dillard was named a finalist for the Biletnikoff Award, a first-team All-American by ESPN, a second-team All-American by Sports Illustrated, a second-team All-American by the Walter Camp Foundation, a second-team All-American by Sporting News, and a second-team All-American by the Associated Press.

At one point Dillard had a streak of 15 straight games in which he had caught a touchdown pass, leaving only Larry Fitzgerald, who had 18 in a row, in front of him. In the New Orleans Bowl, Dillard caught a touchdown pass in the fourth quarter to set a new record for games with a touchdown in a single season (13), besting the mark he shared with Fitzgerald and Randy Moss of 12 games in a season.  In 2006, he caught a total of 21 touchdown passes, which set both Rice and C-USA records. On four separate occasions (Army, UAB, Tulsa, and SMU) he caught three touchdown passes in the same game. He also accumulated 91 catches for 1,247 yards, including 7 games with at least 90 yards: UCLA (102), Texas (91), Florida St. (113), Army (171), UAB (111), Tulsa (137), and SMU (145).

In 2007, Dillard caught another 14 TD passes, earning 1st team C-USA honors and being mentioned by several publications as all-American honorable mention (including 4th team selection by Sports Illustrated). Dillard is one of only 8 players to catch 40 TD passes in a career, a feat he accomplished when he was only a junior.

Dillard holds the NCAA record for career touchdown receptions with 60, eclipsing the prior mark of 50 set by Troy Edwards.

Dillard and Rice quarterback Chase Clement hold the NCAA Division I-A record for career touchdowns between a quarterback-receiver tandem with 51, which has since been tied by Zach Terrell and Corey Davis of Western Michigan. This total does not include the touchdown pass thrown by Dillard to Clement during the final game for both Rice Seniors in the 2008 Texas Bowl. After his senior year, he became the first Rice player to be named to the Football Writers All America team in 50 years (Buddy Dial in 1958).

Awards and honors
Biletnikoff Award Finalist (2006)
New Orleans Bowl (2006)
Texas Bowl (2008)
Football Writers Association of America All-American (2008)
Sports Illustrated All-American (2006, 2008)
Walter Camp All-American (2006,2008)
AP All-American (2008)
Sporting News All-American (2008)
ESPN All-American (2008)
East–West Shrine Game (2009)
Ed Block Courage Award (2011)
Rice Athletic Hall of Fame (2015)

Professional career

2009 NFL Draft

Jacksonville Jaguars
Dillard was drafted by the Jacksonville Jaguars in the 5th round of the 2009 NFL Draft. He is the second Rice player to be taken by Jacksonville after Brandon Green in 2003. On July 17 he was signed to a contract. Length and terms of the contract were undisclosed. As a rookie, Dillard caught six passes for 106 yards before suffering a broken ankle against the Jets in week 10 of the '09 season.

Dillard was placed on the injured reserve list on September 11, 2010 due to a foot injury and did not play a down that year.

Dillard was released by the Jaguars on May 7, 2012.

Detroit Lions
Dillard signed with Detroit on June 16, 2012, but was released on August 27, 2012.

Arizona Cardinals
Dillard signed with the Arizona Cardinals on April 24, 2013. He was waived after given an injury settlement on August 24, 2013.

See also
 List of NCAA major college football yearly receiving leaders
 List of NCAA Division I FBS career receiving touchdowns leaders

References

External links
 Arizona Cardinals bio

1985 births
Living people
American football wide receivers
Rice Owls football players
Players of American football from San Antonio
Jacksonville Jaguars players
Detroit Lions players
Arizona Cardinals players
Texas lawyers
African-American lawyers
21st-century African-American people
20th-century African-American people
Ed Block Courage Award recipients